The Northern Ireland national under-18 schools football team (also known as Northern Ireland U18 schoolboys) represents Northern Ireland in association football at under-18 level. It is controlled by the Northern Ireland Schools Football Association (NISFA) which is affiliated to the Irish Football Association. The main competition competed for by the team is the Centenary Shield (founded 1973) which they won on the first occasion that they entered in 1996. The Northern Ireland under-18 schoolboys side also competes regularly in other minor tournaments and in friendlies.

Honours
 Centenary Shield Winners: 1996, 1998, 1999, 2005 (shared), 2009 (shared), 2011, 2013

See also

 Northern Ireland national football team
 Northern Ireland national under-16 football team
 Northern Ireland national under-17 football team
 Northern Ireland national under-19 football team

References

External links
NISFA
NISFA Records
Centenary Shield Winner
Fixtures & Results
Current squad

Under 18s
European national under-18 association football teams
Youth association football in Northern Ireland